Estadio Lic. Erico Galeano Segovia is a football stadium in  the city of Capiatá, Paraguay. It is the home venue of Deportivo Capiatá.

External links
Soccerway.com

References

Erico